

The Weingartensee is a small lake located east of Täsch at the foot of the Alphubel, in the Swiss canton of Valais. The lake has a surface area of 0.64 ha and is located at 3,058 metres above sea level. It lies near the bottom of the Weingartengletscher glacier.

Following the flood of June 2001, a dam was built and the water level was slightly reduced.

References

Lakes of Valais
Lakes of Switzerland